Frederick Unwin (5 October 1889 – 28 May 1965) was a British swimmer. He competed in the men's 100 metre backstroke event at the 1908 Summer Olympics.

References

External links
 
 

1880s births
1965 deaths
British male swimmers
Olympic swimmers of Great Britain
Swimmers at the 1908 Summer Olympics
People from Maldon District
British male backstroke swimmers